Moriondo Torinese is a comune (municipality) in the Metropolitan City of Turin in the Italian region Piedmont, located about  east of Turin.

Moriondo Torinese borders the following municipalities: Moncucco Torinese, Castelnuovo Don Bosco, Mombello di Torino, Buttigliera d'Asti, and Riva presso Chieri.

References

Cities and towns in Piedmont